Härma or Harma may refer to:

Places
Harma (Attica), a town of ancient Attica, Greece
Harma (Boeotia), a town of ancient Boeotia, Greece
Härma, Harju County, village in Raasiku Parish, Harju County, Estonia
Härma, Hiiu County, village in Emmaste Parish, Hiiu County, Estonia
Härmä, village in Meremäe Parish, Võru County, Estonia

People
Miina Härma (1864–1941), Estonian composer

Animals
Harma (butterfly), a monotypic butterfly genus containing Harma theobene, the angular glider

See also
Härmä (disambiguation)

Estonian-language surnames